The Ecumenical Rogate Monastery St. Michael in Berlin was founded on September 29, 2010, the feast day of St. Michael the Archangel. He is the patron saint for the project to establish a monastery for all Christian denominations in Germany's capital city. The monastery will be a place of hope, where prayers are offered and the Holy Eucharist is celebrated without separation. The driving force behind this endeavor is Lutheran Augustinian Brother, Francis M. Schaar. A circle of friends is collecting donations to make the project a reality.

External links 
 Homepage Ökumenisches Rogate-Kloster zu Berlin
 Homepage Rogate-Initiative e.V.

Monasteries in Berlin
Christian organizations established in 2010
2010 establishments in Germany